Adrian Krainer (born 22 November 1992) is an Austrian snowboarder. He is a participant at the 2014 Winter Olympics in Sochi.

References

1992 births
Snowboarders at the 2014 Winter Olympics
Living people
Olympic snowboarders of Austria
Austrian male snowboarders